Bo Braastrup Andersen (26 March 1976 - ) is a Danish football manager and former goalkeeper. He is currently managing Stavanger IF.

Playing career
Bo Braastrup Andersen played for Lyngby FC, Bristol City F.C., Djurgårdens IF, Viking FK, UD Las Palmas, Køge BK, Tromsø IL, Slagelse B&I, Stavanger IF, and Sandnes Ulf.

Management career
In January 2013, he took over Stavanger IF.
He resigned from Stavanger IF the following December. He was managing Ålgård FK until 2020.

Career statistics

References

Danish men's footballers
Danish football managers
1976 births
Living people
Danish Superliga players
Danish 1st Division players
English Football League players
Allsvenskan players
Segunda División players
Eliteserien players
Norwegian First Division players
Lyngby Boldklub players
Bristol City F.C. players
Djurgårdens IF Fotboll players
Viking FK players
UD Las Palmas players
Køge Boldklub players
Tromsø IL players
Stavanger IF players
Sandnes Ulf players
Sandnes Ulf managers
Danish expatriate men's footballers
Expatriate footballers in England
Expatriate footballers in Sweden
Expatriate footballers in Spain
Expatriate footballers in Norway
Danish expatriate sportspeople in England
Danish expatriate sportspeople in Sweden
Danish expatriate sportspeople in Spain
Danish expatriate sportspeople in Norway
People from Slagelse
Association football goalkeepers
Sportspeople from Region Zealand